Damon Roswell "Dee" Phillips (June 8, 1919 – November 4, 2004) was an American professional baseball player, manager and scout. A shortstop and third baseman born in Corsicana, Texas, Phillips threw and batted right-handed, stood 6 feet (1.8 m) tall and weighed 176 pounds (80 kg). He played in Major League Baseball for the Cincinnati Reds (1942) and Boston Braves (1944; 1946).

Phillips' professional career began in 1938 when he was signed by the Detroit Tigers after a tryout with the Tigers' Texas League farm club, the Beaumont Exporters. However, he was declared a free agent by Commissioner of Baseball Kenesaw Mountain Landis after the  season and was barred from re-signing with Detroit. He eventually joined the Reds' organization and was called to the majors in the middle of the 1942 season. He appeared in 28 games for Cincinnati and batted .202 in 84 at-bats. 

On October 1, 1943, he was acquired by the Boston Braves and spent the entire 1944 campaign in Boston, playing in 140 games and hitting .258 in 489 at-bats. He then served in the United States Army and lost the 1945 season, and most of 1946, to military service. The Braves played Phillips in two games in September 1946, but the remainder of his  playing career would be spent in minor league baseball and winter baseball. He played for ten years at the Triple-A level with the Milwaukee Brewers, Montreal Royals, Baltimore Orioles and Richmond Virginians.

Phillips managed in the farm systems of the New York Yankees and the MLB Baltimore Orioles, then scouted for Baltimore and the Tigers in his native Texas. Among those he signed for the Orioles was future MLB second baseman and manager Davey Johnson. Dee Phillips died at age 85 in Fort Worth, Texas.

References

External links

1919 births
2004 deaths
Baltimore Orioles (IL) players
Baltimore Orioles scouts
Baseball players from Texas
Binghamton Triplets managers
Boston Braves players
Cincinnati Reds players
Columbia Reds players
Dayton Ducks players
Detroit Tigers scouts
Durham Bulls players
Fargo-Moorhead Twins players
Harlingen Hubs players
Henderson Oilers players
Indianapolis Indians players
Lake Charles Skippers players
Major League Baseball shortstops
Major League Baseball third basemen
Milwaukee Brewers (minor league) players
Modesto Reds players
Montreal Royals players
Pensacola Pilots players
Richmond Virginians (minor league) players
Riverside Reds players
St. Paul Saints (AA) players
Stockton Ports players
Syracuse Chiefs players
United States Army personnel of World War II